Samantha Murray Sharan and Jessika Ponchet were the defending champions but chose not to participate.

Magali Kempen and Wu Fang-hsien won the title defeating Veronika Erjavec and Emily Webley-Smith in the final, 6–2, 6–4.

Seeds

Draw

Draw

References

External Links
Main Draw

Engie Open Nantes Atlantique - Doubles